Laguna Negra orthohantavirus (LANV) is a species of virus in the genus Orthohantavirus.

References

Hantaviridae